John Newmaster (fl. 1391–1407) of Wells, Somerset, was an English politician.

He was a Member (MP) of the Parliament of England for Wells in 1391, 1393, 1394 and 1407.

References

14th-century births
15th-century deaths
English MPs 1391
English MPs 1393
Politicians from Somerset
English MPs 1394
English MPs 1407